Clivina trachys is a species of ground beetle in the subfamily Scaritinae. It was described by Andrewes in 1930.

References

trachys
Beetles described in 1930